L'Audace (Italian for "The Bold") was a weekly children and comic magazine published in Italy from 1934 to 1944.

History and profile
Founded by Lotario Vecchi in January 1934, the magazine was published by S.A.E.V, except for a short time in which it was published by Mondadori. For its first sixty issues, it did not include comics, but only columns and illustrated short stories and novellas. It had initially  a good commercial success, with an average circulation of about 180,000 copies per week. It introduced to the Italian audience several successful American comic series, notably Superman, Tarzan, Brick Bradford, Mandrake the Magician. It also included several Italian comic series, such as Dick Fulmine and Walter Molino's Capitan Audace.

See also
 List of magazines in Italy

Notes

1934 establishments in Italy
1944 disestablishments in Italy
1934 comics debuts
1944 comics endings
Children's magazines published in Italy 
Comics magazines published in Italy
Defunct magazines published in Italy
Italian-language magazines
Magazines established in 1934
Magazines disestablished in 1944
Weekly magazines published in Italy